Gustavo Henrique may refer to:

Footballers
 Gustavo (footballer, born 1994), full name Gustavo Henrique da Silva Sousa, Brazilian forward
 Gustavo (footballer, born 1997), full name Gustavo Henrique Correia Pereira, Brazilian defender
 Gustavo (footballer, born 1999), full name Gustavo Henrique Cabral de Souza, Brazilian forward
 Gustavo Henrique (footballer, born 1993), full name Gustavo Henrique Vernes, Brazilian defender
 Gustavo Henrique (footballer, born May 1999), full name Gustavo Henrique Alves Rodrigues, Brazilian forward
 Gustavo Henrique (footballer, born October 1999), full name Gustavo Henrique Santos, Brazilian defender
 Gustavo Henrique Ferrareis (born 1996), Brazilian midfielder
 Gustavo Tocantins (born 1996), full name Gustavo Henrique Barbosa Freire, Brazilian forward
 Gustavo Nescau (born 2000), full name Gustavo Henrique Alves Silva, Brazilian forward

Other
 Gustavo Henrique Araújo (born 1992), Brazilian Paralympic track and field athletic
 Gustavo Henrique Silva (born 1979), Brazilian handballer